The 2019 Pingshan Open was a professional tennis tournament played on outdoor hard courts. It was the sixth and fifth editions of the tournament which was part of the 2019 ATP Challenger Tour and the 2019 ITF Women's World Tennis Tour. It took place in Shenzhen, China between 11 and 17 March 2019.

Men's singles main-draw entrants

Seeds

 1 Rankings are as of 4 March 2019.

Other entrants
The following players received wildcards into the singles main draw:
  He Yecong
  Wu Di
  Wu Yibing
  Xia Zihao
  Zhang Zhizhen

The following players received entry into the singles main draw using their ITF World Tennis Ranking:
  Javier Barranco Cosano
  Raúl Brancaccio
  Baptiste Crepatte
  Karim-Mohamed Maamoun

The following players received entry from the qualifying draw:
  Colin Sinclair
  Evgenii Tiurnev

Women's singles main-draw entrants

Seeds

 1 Rankings are as of 4 March 2019.

Other entrants
The following players received wildcards into the singles main draw:
  Guo Meiqi
  Ma Shuyue
  Wu Meixu
  Yuan Yue

The following player received entry using a junior exempt:
  Clara Tauson

The following players received entry from the qualifying draw:
  Feng Shuo
  Ma Yexin
  Chihiro Muramatsu
  Kyōka Okamura
  Sarah-Rebecca Sekulic
  You Xiaodi

Champions

Men's singles

 Marcos Baghdatis def.  Stefano Napolitano 6–2, 3–6, 6–4.

Women's singles

 Clara Tauson def.  Liu Fangzhou, 6–4, 6–3

Men's doubles

 Hsieh Cheng-peng /  Christopher Rungkat def.  Li Zhe /  Gonçalo Oliveira 6–4, 3–6, [10–6].

Women's doubles

 Liang En-shuo /  Xun Fangying def.  Hiroko Kuwata /  Sabina Sharipova, 6–4, 6–1

References

External links
 2019 Pingshan Open at ITFtennis.com

Pingshan Open
2019 ITF Women's World Tennis Tour
2019 ATP Challenger Tour
2019 in Chinese tennis
March 2019 sports events in China